Conus archon, common name the magistrate cone, is a species of sea snail, a marine gastropod mollusk in the family Conidae, the cone snails and their allies.

Like all species within the genus Conus, these snails are predatory and venomous. They are capable of "stinging" humans, therefore live ones should be handled carefully or not at all.

Description
The spire is concavely elevated, not coronated. The body whorl is smooth and slightly striate below. The shell is irregularly marbled with chestnut and white, with equidistant chestnut revolving lines bearing white spots. The length of the shell varies between 38 mm and 70 mm

Distribution
This marine species occurs off the West Coast of Mexico and Central America (the Gulf of California to Panama)

References

 Tucker J.K. & Tenorio M.J. (2009) Systematic classification of Recent and fossil conoidean gastropods. Hackenheim: Conchbooks. 296 pp.
 Puillandre N., Duda T.F., Meyer C., Olivera B.M. & Bouchet P. (2015). One, four or 100 genera? A new classification of the cone snails. Journal of Molluscan Studies. 81: 1–23

External links
 The Conus Biodiversity website
 Cone Shells – Knights of the Sea

archon
Gastropods described in 1833
Taxa named by William Broderip